Cuisses are a form of medieval armour worn to protect the thigh. The word is the plural of the French word cuisse meaning 'thigh'. While the skirt of a maille shirt or tassets of a cuirass could protect the upper legs from above, a thrust from below could avoid these defenses. Thus, cuisses were worn on the thighs to protect from such blows. Padded cuisses made in a similar way to a gambeson were commonly worn by knights in the 12th and 13th centuries, usually over chausses, and may have had poleyns directly attached to them. Whilst continental armours typically had cuisses that did not protect the back of the thigh, English cuisses were typically entirely encapsulating, due to the English preference for foot combat over the mounted cavalry charges favoured by continental armies. 

Cuisses could also be made of brigandine or splinted leather, but beginning around 1340 they were typically made from steel plate armour. From 1370 onward they were made from a single plate of iron or steel.

Citations

References

 

Western plate armour